The United Christian Democratic Party is a minor political party in South Africa. It was founded by Lucas Mangope, leader of the Bophuthatswana bantustan in 1997, as a successor to the Tswana National Party, and led by him for the first fifteen years of its existence. Mavis Matladi was elected as its leader on 29 January 2011 after the expulsion of Mangope. Matladi died in December 2011. Isaac Sipho Mfundisi was elected president on Saturday, 7 January 2012.

Mfundisi was succeeded by the current President Modiri Desmond Sehume who was elected in the Federal Congress in 2019.

Most of the party's support comes from the North West province (where the old Bophuthatswana was located), and it has very little presence elsewhere in the country. The UCDP was the official opposition to the African National Congress in the North West province in 1999 and 2004, but slipped to 4th in the provincial legislature in 2009, and lost all of its seats in the provincial legislature in 2014.

In the 2009 elections, the party won 66,086 votes (0.37% of the national total), and 2 seats in Parliament, representing a loss of approximately 50% of its support, and 1 seat, from the preceding elections.

In the provincial elections, their support dropped from 8.49% and 3 seats in the 2004 North West provincial election, to 5,27% and 2 seats in 2009. In 2009, in six of the other provinces, they gained less than 0.1% support.

In the  2014 elections, the party slumped further, losing all of its provincial and national seats.

After the 2021 municipal elections, the UCDP retains a small presence at local level with elected representatives in five municipalities, all in the North West.

The party's mission statement stresses the need for Christian values, non-racial democracy, and government inducements for personal self-reliance, while the 2004 manifesto attacked the ANC for, among other things, its alleged softness on crime, nepotism, and neglect of South African infrastructure.

A 2003 survey conducted by the Human Sciences Research Council found that 85% of UCDP voters were female.

Election results

National elections 

|-
! Election
! Total votes
! Share of vote
! Seats 
! +/–
! Government
|-
! 1999
| 125,280
| 0.80
| 
| –
| 
|-
! 2004
| 117,792
| 0.75
| 
|  ±0
| 
|-
! 2009
| 66,086
| 0.37
| 
|  1
| 
|-
! 2014
| 21,744
| 0.12
| 
|  2
| 
|}

Provincial elections

! rowspan=2 | Election
! colspan=2 | Eastern Cape
! colspan=2 | Free State
! colspan=2 | Gauteng
! colspan=2 | Kwazulu-Natal
! colspan=2 | Limpopo
! colspan=2 | Mpumalanga
! colspan=2 | North-West
! colspan=2 | Northern Cape
! colspan=2 | Western Cape
|- 
! % !! Seats
! % !! Seats
! % !! Seats
! % !! Seats
! % !! Seats
! % !! Seats
! % !! Seats
! % !! Seats
! % !! Seats
|-
! 1999
| - || -
| 0.78% || 0/30
| 0.24% || 0/73
| - || -
| 0.23% || 0/49
| - || -
| 9.57% || 3/33
| - || -
| - || -
|-
! 2004
| 0.12% || 0/63
| 0.77% || 0/30
| 0.26% || 0/73
| 0.14% || 0/80
| 0.22% || 0/49
| 0.17% || 0/30
| 8.49% || 3/33
| 0.33% || 0/30
| 0.23% || 0/42
|-
! 2009
| 0.08% || 0/63
| 0.33% || 0/30
| 0.24% || 0/73
| 0.05% || 0/80
| 0.09% || 0/49
| 0.07% || 0/30
| 5.27% || 2/33
| 1.21% || 0/30
| 0.08% || 0/42
|-
! 2014
| 0.05% || 0/63
| 0.11% || 0/30
| 0.08% || 0/73
| 0.06% || 0/80
| 0.06% || 0/49
| 0.06% || 0/30
| 1.18% || 0/33
| 0.37% || 0/30
| 0.05% || 0/42
|-
! 2019
| - || -
| - || -
| - || -
| - || -
| - || -
| - || -
| 0.48% || 0/33
| - || -
| - || -
|}

Municipal elections

|-
! Election
! Votes
! %
|-
! 2000
|  
| 1.0%
|-
! 2006
| 334,504
| 1.3%
|-
! 2011
| 168,351
| 0.6%
|-
! 2016
| 28,241
| 0.07%
|-
! 2021
| 26,331
| 0.09%
|}

References

External links

United Christian Democratic Party official site

1997 establishments in South Africa
2004 establishments in South Africa
Christian democratic parties in South Africa
Conservative parties in South Africa
Political parties established in 1997
Political parties established in 2004
Political parties in South Africa
Protestant political parties